In the Sweet Pie and Pie is a 1941 short subject directed by Jules White starring American slapstick comedy team The Three Stooges (Moe Howard, Larry Fine and Curly Howard). It is the 58th entry in the series released by Columbia Pictures starring the comedians, who released 190 shorts for the studio between 1934 and 1959.

Plot
Tiska (Dorothy Appleby), Taska (Mary Ainslee) and Baska (Ethelreda Leopold) Jones, three snippy society girls, are willed a huge inheritance so long as they are married by a certain time and date, but their fiances postpone their engagements as they, along with the Fleet, are bound for Honolulu. Their shrewd lawyer Diggins (Richard Fiske) suggests they marry three death row inmates, the Mushroom Murder Gang (the Stooges) to retain the dough; once they are married, they get their inheritance, the convicts are hanged, and the girls can marry their fiances free and clear. The girls soon show up to the Stooges' cell and marry the three inmates, then the girls depart. (Moe and Curly, disappointed that they did not receive a wedding kiss, give each other a kiss instead.)

The Stooges are brought to the scaffold at Hang-em'-all Prison as other prisoners watch from the stands. But the ropes break during the hanging attempt, and the Stooges and the warden are tangled in a mess below the scaffold. A message arrives saying the governor has pardoned the Stooges after Mickey Finn and his gang confessed to the Mushroom murders, and the boys are freed. As the girls celebrate their new bout of widowhood, the Stooges make their way into their house and make themselves at home.

Mortified, the devious debutantes try to think up an excuse to divorce their new beaus and decide to force them to become society gentlemen, something they feel the Stooges will be unable to accomplish. However, the Stooges realize what their wives are up to and decide they need to succeed so their wives cannot throw them out. After enrolling the Stooges in an ill-fated dance lesson, and after finding them to be more accommodating to entering society, the girls turn to their lawyer again for help. They demand Diggins fix this mess they're in because he was the one who got them to marry the Stooges in the first place. He suggests that the girls throw a formal party, hoping the Stooges will make shambles of the evening. They do, and Diggins bribes the maître d’, Williams (John Tyrrell) to hit Moe with a large cake to make it look like Moe was guilty. However, his plan fails as the girls' society friends sympathize with Moe and blame Williams for setting him up. The evening ends with the Stooges' first genuine pie fight. Diggins chastises the boys for their social ineptness and threatens to annul their marriages at once. However, the girls have had enough of Diggins and decide to keep the Stooges as their husbands. They, along with the Stooges and the other guests in attendance, strike back at Diggins by covering him in pie from head to toe.

Production notes
In the Sweet Pie and Pie was filmed between April 30 and May 3, 1941. The film makes references to several popular songs/series' of the era:
Moe's comment "I am The Shadow" parodies the 1940 Columbia radio serial The Shadow.
"Bill Stein," who broadcasts a "jerk-by-jerk" description of the hanging of the Mushroom Murder Mob, is a parody of real-life sportscaster Bill Stern.
The title In the Sweet Pie and Pie is a play on the old song, "In the Sweet By and By"; the names of the sisters, Tiska, Taska, and Baska, were a play on the song, "A-Tisket, A-Tasket"; Curly's comment to Moe "I hear a rhipsody" parodies the 1940 song "I Hear a Rhapsody".

Footage was borrowed from earlier shorts and reused for In the Sweet Pie and Pie:
The dancing lesson sequence was lifted from Hoi Polloi.
The cell block footage is later re-used in Beer Barrel Polecats.
Several shots from the pie fight would later appear in Pest Man Wins.In the Sweet Pie and Pie marked the final appearance of supporting actor Richard Fiske. A perfect foil for the Stooges, Fiske's promising career was cut short when he was killed in action during World War II.

Pie fights
Larry Fine recalled that the most grueling scenes in In the Sweet Pie and Pie'' involved pies:

References

External links 
 
 
 In the Sweet Pie and Pie at threestooges.net

1941 films
The Three Stooges films
American black-and-white films
Films directed by Jules White
1941 comedy films
Columbia Pictures short films
American slapstick comedy films
1940s English-language films
1940s American films